Alessandro Mercati (born 12 April 2002) is an Italian professional footballer who plays as a midfielder for  club Carrarese, on loan from  Sassuolo.

Club career
On 1 August 2022, Mercati was loaned to Carrarese.

References

External links

2002 births
Living people
Sportspeople from the Province of Reggio Emilia
Footballers from Emilia-Romagna
Italian footballers
Association football midfielders
Serie C players
U.S. Sassuolo Calcio players
Montevarchi Calcio Aquila 1902 players
Carrarese Calcio players